John Michael Russell was a British rower who competed in the 1960 Summer Olympics and the 1964 Summer Olympics.

Rowing career
Russell was born on 3 August 1935 in Chiswick, London. In 1959, he won both the Wingfield Sculls and the Scullers Head of the River Race.

In 1960, he was a crew member of the British coxed four which was eliminated in the repechage of the coxed four event at the 1960 Summer Olympics. In the same year, he won both the Grand Challenge Cup and the Stewards Challenge Cup at Henley Royal Regatta.

He represented England and won double Bronze in the coxed four and eights at the 1962 British Empire and Commonwealth Games in Perth, Western Australia.

Two years later, he won a silver medal in the coxless four at the 1964 Summer Olympics with Hugh Wardell-Yerburgh, William Barry and John James.

Gallery

References

1935 births
2019 deaths
Rowers from Greater London
British male rowers
Olympic rowers of Great Britain
Rowers at the 1960 Summer Olympics
Rowers at the 1964 Summer Olympics
Olympic silver medallists for Great Britain
Olympic medalists in rowing
Medalists at the 1964 Summer Olympics
Rowers at the 1962 British Empire and Commonwealth Games
Commonwealth Games medallists in rowing
Commonwealth Games bronze medallists for England
Medallists at the 1962 British Empire and Commonwealth Games